Busuanga, is the largest island in the Calamian Group of islands in the province of Palawan in the Philippines. Busuanga Island is the second largest island in the province after Palawan island itself. The island is located halfway between the islands of Mindoro and Palawan with the South China Sea located to the west and the Sulu Sea to the southeast. South of the island are the two other major islands of the Calamian Group: Culion Island and Coron Island. The western third of the island is under the municipality of Busuanga and the eastern two-thirds belong to the municipality of Coron. 

Busuanga Island is known as a recreational diving location due to World War II Japanese wrecks that were sunk by American navy bombings in Coron Bay, a natural anchorage near the town center of Coron, on September 24, 1944.

Geology
Part of the North Palawan Block, Busuanga Island consists mainly of the Liminangcong Formation, a Permian to Late Jurassic chert. This chert forms the distinguishing mountain ranges, with the Middle-Late Jurassic Guinlo Formation clastics forming the valleys on Busuanga. Braunite is the common manganese mineral type found in the ore.

Reference

External links
 
 Images from a dive trip to Coron, Busuanga in April 2006
 Landscapes of Busuanga 2012

Calamian Islands
Underwater diving sites in the Philippines